Millennium Park is a private park in Kolkata, situated along the Strand Road on eastern shore of Hooghly River for a stretch of 2.5 km near Fairlie Ghat and opposite to Railway Club. The park consists of landscaped gardens and children's amusement rides.It was opened along the riverside to provide a green area for Kolkata's polluted waterway. It is a millennium gift from Kolkata Metropolitan Development Authority  

inaugurated on 26 December 1999. The park is part of the first phases of the Kolkata Riverside Beautification Project. The park is normally open from 11am-8pm, but currently closed since March 2020 after the COVID-19 lockdown.

Entertainment tools
The park is adorned with a variety of trees and lights. It includes a variety of activities in the form of fun-filled activities such as kids zone, lush green gardens, manicured grass, playground, toy train, pirates, bumpy cars, break dance, boat ride etc. Hence children come to take picnics with their families on Sunday or holidays take advantage of activities such as norka vihar etc. This park has a big food court with eight stalls which is adorned on wooden branches with tables and chairs. currently, The Government of West Bengal has started many projects to enhance the beauty of the Ganges river. The people of Kolkata come here to spend a quiet and relaxed evening on a special occasion. Recently, Howrah Bridge sound and light show can be witnessed from here.

See also
 Kolkata Eye
 Hooghly Riverfront

References

Parks in Kolkata
Buildings and structures celebrating the third millennium